The 40th Golden Globe Awards, honoring the best in film and television for 1982, were given on 29 January 1983.

Winners and nominees

Film 

The following films received multiple nominations:

The following films received multiple wins:

Television

The following programs received multiple nominations:

The following programs received multiple wins:

Ceremony

Presenters 

 Catherine Bach
 James Brolin
 Joan Collins
 Richard Dreyfuss
 Robert Goulet
 Lisa Hartman
 Dustin Hoffman
 Shelley Long
 Donna Mills
 Stefanie Powers
 Victoria Principal
 Aileen Quinn
 Wayne Rogers
 Tom Selleck
 Jane Seymour
 William Shatner
 Robert Wagner
 Dee Wallace

Cecil B. DeMille Award 
Laurence Olivier

See also
55th Academy Awards
3rd Golden Raspberry Awards
34th Primetime Emmy Awards
35th Primetime Emmy Awards
 36th British Academy Film Awards
 37th Tony Awards
 1982 in film
 1982 in American television

References
IMdb 1983 Golden Globe Awards

040
1982 film awards
1982 television awards
January 1983 events in the United States
Golden Globe